Chepauk is a station on the Chennai MRTS railway line. It is located in the eastern Chennai neighbourhood of Chepauk near the M. A. Chidambaram Stadium. The station is built on the bank of Buckingham Canal. The station was opened in November 1995 as a part of the first phase, when services were operated from Chennai Beach station to Chepauk. As it is adjacent to the government offices in the area, such as Kuralagam and Doordarshan, the station sees many commuters who work in these offices.

Services and connections

It is currently the fifth station from Chennai Beach station heading towards Velachery (Chennai MRTS), and is the thirteenth station from Velachery towards Chennai Beach station. The station building contains a 1500 square meter car park in its lower level.

Nearby landmarks
M. A. Chidambaram Cricket Stadium is located adjacent to the station. The station thus offers a "vantage view" of the matches played in the stadium. The University of Madras, Chepauk campus and the Tamil Nadu Public Works Department main building are also located near the station; the station itself serves as a commute to a large number of students, professors and government officials working in these premises.

See also
 Chennai MRTS
 Chennai suburban railway
 Chennai Metro
 Transport in Chennai

References

Chennai Mass Rapid Transit System stations
Railway stations in Chennai
Railway stations opened in 1995